Nandor Kuti (born 10 January 1997) is a Romanian professional basketball player for U-BT Cluj-Napoca of the Liga Națională, and the Romanian national team. He participated at the EuroBasket 2017.

References

1997 births
Living people
Basketball players at the 2014 Summer Youth Olympics
CS Universitatea Cluj-Napoca (men's basketball) players
People from Sfântu Gheorghe
Romanian men's basketball players
Small forwards
21st-century Romanian people